KBOZ (1090 kHz) is an AM radio station licensed to Bozeman, Montana, United States. The station serves the greater Bozeman area. The station's licensee is held by Desert Mountain Broadcasting Licenses, LLC.

The offices and all the studios are located southwest of Bozeman at "Radio Ranch", 5445 Johnson Road. KBOZ shares a transmitter site with KBOZ-FM and KOBB-FM, east of the studios on Johnson Road and Fowler Lane. KBOZ-FM, KOZB, and KOBB-FM all have construction permits to move to a new shared transmitter site on top of Green Mountain, along I-90 east of Bozeman.

On June 1, 2018, KBOZ and its sister stations went off the air.

Effective December 6, 2019, KBOZ and its sister stations' licenses were involuntary assigned from Reier Broadcasting Company, Inc. to Richard J. Samson, as Receiver. The licenses for these stations were sold to Desert Mountain Broadcasting Licenses, LLC in a deal completed in January 2022.

Previous logo

References

External links
FCC History Cards for KBOZ

BOZ (AM)
Radio stations established in 1975
1975 establishments in Montana